Minouche Smit (born 6 March 1975) is a former freestyle and medley swimmer from the Netherlands. At the 1996 Summer Olympics in Atlanta, Georgia, she finished in sixth position (8:08.48) with the 4×200 m freestyle relay, alongside Carla Geurts, Patricia Stokkers, and Kirsten Vlieghuis. A year earlier the four of them won the silver medal in the same event at the European LC Championships in Vienna, Austria. In Atlanta Smit was also on the women's relay team, that ended up in fourth place (3:42.40) in the 4×100 m freestyle, together with Marianne Muis, Wilma van Hofwegen, and Karin Brienesse. In her only individual start, in the 200 m individual medley, she finished in seventh position, clocking 2:16.73. 

Smit was married to the Dutch swimming star Pieter van den Hoogenband. They have a daughter Daphne (born 23 June 2007) and a son Sander (born 13 September 2009). In September 2012 the couple announced their separation.

References

1975 births
Living people
Dutch female freestyle swimmers
Dutch female medley swimmers
Olympic swimmers of the Netherlands
Swimmers at the 1996 Summer Olympics
People from Hoorn
European Aquatics Championships medalists in swimming
Sportspeople from North Holland
20th-century Dutch women